The South West African 0-10-0 of 1911 was a steam locomotive from the German South West Africa era.

In 1911, the Lüderitzbucht Eisenbahn (Lüderitzbucht Railway) in German South West Africa placed six locomotives with a  Decapod type wheel arrangement in service. They were no longer in service when all railways in the territory came under the administration of the South African Railways in 1922.

Manufacturer
Six locomotives with a  Decapod type wheel arrangement were built in 1910 by Henschel & Son of Kassel in Germany for a French Colony in Africa. The engines were rejected by French inspectors, however, and they were purchased by the German government for £2,000 each in 1911, on behalf of the Lüderitzbucht-Gesellschaft company who leased the Lüderitzbucht Eisenbahn and shared the profits with the government.

Characteristics
The locomotive had flat "D" type sliding valves which were actuated by Heusinger valve gear, with Laird type crossheads with single slide bars. To protect the motion from wind-blown sand in the Namib Desert, it had plate shields arranged along the full length of the engine, hinged on the running board to allow access to the motion.

It had coupled wheels of  diameter and cylinders of  bore and  stroke.

To allow side-play in curves, the axle boxes of the leading and trailing coupled wheels had no inside flanges. Their wheel arrangement, without leading or trailing wheels to lend stability at speed, was more suitable for yard work at slow speeds than for mainline working. According to one report, their utilisation as mainline engines rapidly resulted in the development of excessive side-play to the extent that the tyres eventually cut into the spring hangers.

Service
The locomotives were numbered in the range from 101 to 106 and were placed in service on the Südbahn line from Lüderitzbucht via Seeheim to Kalkfontein, where they formed the mainstay of motive power. Even though the engines were popular with the enginemen, they were not economical in operation. Owing to their light construction, they were allowed to take only three-quarters of their full load.

None of these engines survived the First World War.

References

0880
0-10-0 locomotives
E locomotives
Henschel locomotives
Cape gauge railway locomotives
Railway locomotives introduced in 1911